Antoneta Papapavli (17 February 1938 – 13 September 2013) was an Albanian actress. She has usually played the roles of ladies, rich women, mountaineers, directors and mothers throughout her work as both a film and theater actress.

Personal life
Papapavli was born on 17 February 1938 in Përmet in southern Albania.

Papapavli died in her sleep on 13 September 2013, aged 75, in Tirana.

References

External links

1938 births
2013 deaths
Albanian actresses
Albanian film actresses
Albanian stage actresses
People from Përmet
20th-century Albanian actresses